The 1976 Major League Baseball season ended with the Cincinnati Reds winning their second consecutive World Series championship.

This was the last season of the expansion era (dating back to 1961) until 1993 in which the American League (AL) and the National League (NL) had the same number of teams.

A lockout occurred during March 1–17, but it did not impact the regular season.

The All-Star Game, held at Veterans Stadium in Philadelphia, was a 7–1 victory for the NL over the AL.

The Reds won the 1976 World Series by sweeping the New York Yankees in four games; the Reds remain the only team to go undefeated in the postseason since the advent of the divisional era in 1969. This was the second time that the Yankees were swept in a World Series, the first having been by the Los Angeles Dodgers in the 1963 World Series.

Standings

American League

National League

Postseason

Bracket

Awards and honors

July–October
July 8 – At Wrigley Field, Randy Jones wins his 16th game of the year for the San Diego Padres, a National League record for wins at the All-Star break. He beats the Chicago Cubs 6–3. In the second half of the season, Jones will lose seven games by one run, two of them by 1–0 scores.
July 9 – In Montreal, the Houston Astros' Larry Dierker no-hits the host Montreal Expos, 6–0. He strikes out eight batters, including the first two in the ninth inning. Dierker had previously thrown two one-hitters.
July 13 – The National League emerges victorious in the annual All-Star Game by a score of 7–1. George Foster, one of seven Cincinnati Reds position players on the squad, hits a home run with three RBI, and is named the MVP. Rookie pitcher Mark Fidrych gives up two runs and takes the loss. It is the NL's 13th win over the American League in the last 14 games.
July 19 – Willie Davis of the San Diego Padres gets his 2500th hit versus the Chicago Cubs, a single in the 4th off of Bill Bonham at San Diego Stadium. The Padres won 3-2.
July 20 – Hank Aaron hits the 755th and last home run of his career, connecting off Dick Drago of the California Angels.
July 23 – In a game against the Taiyō Whales, Sadaharu Oh of the Yomiuri Giants hits his 700th home run, the first player in Nippon Professional Baseball to do so.
July 24 – In a 17-2 blowout of the Chicago White Sox, Lyman Bostock becomes the fourth Minnesota Twin to hit for the cycle.  Batting fourth for the first time ever, he goes four-for-four, with four RBI and four runs scored.
July 26 – Carl Yastrzemski of the Boston Red Sox gets his 2500th hit versus the Cleveland Indians, a double in the 1st off of Stan Thomas at Fenway Park. The Red Sox lost 9-4. Yastrzemski was beaten to the milestone one week earlier by his contemporary, Willie Davis on July 19. 
July 28 – Blue Moon Odom and Francisco Barrios combine on a no-hitter as the Chicago White Sox top the Oakland Athletics 2–1. For Odom, this is his last major league victory.
August 8 – The first game of today's Royals–White Sox double header at Comiskey Park sees the White Sox appear on the field in shorts.  The Sox return to long pants for the second game, after stealing five bases and defeating the Royals, 5-2.
August 9 – John Candelaria became the first Pirates pitcher in 69 years to throw a no-hitter in Pittsburgh by blanking the Los Angeles Dodgers 2-0. Candelaria's no-hitter came at Three Rivers Stadium. No Pirate ever threw a no-hitter at Forbes Field.
September 3 – At Shea Stadium, Tom Seaver fans Tommy Hutton of the Phillies in the 7th inning of the Mets 1-0 victory. Hutton is Seaver's 200th strikeout victim of the season – the 9th straight year the Mets' right-hander has reached that mark.
September 6 – Dodgers catcher Steve Yeager is seriously injured when the jagged end of a broken bat strikes him in the throat while he is waiting in the on-deck circle.
September 10 – California's Nolan Ryan strikes out 18 White Sox hitters in a 9-inning 3-2 victory at Chicago.
September 11 – Orestes "Minnie" Miñoso comes out of his twelve-year retirement.  Playing at home for the White Sox, he goes 0-for-3 against Frank Tanana.  The next day, he will single, becoming the oldest player to hit safely in a Major League game.
September 18 – Player-Manager Frank Robinson of the Cleveland Indians inserts himself into the lineup as a pinch hitter in the eight inning of a game against the Baltimore Orioles.  He singles in what will be his final at-bat as a player.  His influence as a manager and executive will continue for decades to come.
September 21 – In Cincinnati, the Cincinnati Reds clinch the National League West title with a 9-1 pasting of the San Diego Padres.
September 25 – The Yankees put an end to a 6-game losing streak with a 10-6 win over the Tigers to wrap up the Al East, the Yankees' first visit to the postseason since the 1964 World Series. Doyle Alexander gets the victory.
September 26 – In the last big league games at Montreal's Jarry Park, the Philadelphia Phillies beat the Montreal Expos 4-1 in the first game of a doubleheader to clinch the National League East title. Philly takes the nightcap, 2-1. Following the 2nd game, Dick Allen jumps the team in protest of the fact that veteran Tony Taylor is not listed on the post-season roster.
September 28 – The Dodgers' Walter Alston, after 23 seasons and 2,040 victories, steps down as manager. Third base coach Tommy Lasorda is promoted to the post.
September 29 – John Montefusco of the San Francisco Giants no-hits the Atlanta Braves 9-0 at Atlanta–Fulton County Stadium.
October 3 - Hank Aaron plays the final game of his eventual hall of fame career in a loss to the Detroit Tigers in Milwaukee County Stadium 5-2. He had 3 at bats being struck out the first two times with the final at bat being an RBI.

Statistical leaders

Home Field Attendance

References

External links
1976 Major League Baseball season schedule at Baseball Reference

 
Major League Baseball seasons